The Giant slalom competitions of the 2011 IPC Alpine Skiing World Championships were held at Kandahar Banchetta Giovanni N., in Sestriere, Italy on January 22.

Women

Visually Impaired
In the giant slalom visually impaired, the athlete with a visual impairment has a sighted guide. The two skiers are considered a team, and dual medals are awarded.

Standing

Sitting

Men

Visually Impaired
In the giant slalom visually impaired, the athlete with a visual impairment has a sighted guide. The two skiers are considered a team, and dual medals are awarded.

Standing

Sitting

See also
2011 IPC Alpine Skiing World Championships - Team event

References

External links
2011 IPC Alpine Skiing World Championships - Giant Slalom at ParalympicSportTV's Official YouTube channel

Giant slalom